Lance Kinsey (born June 13, 1954) is a Canadian actor and screenwriter, best known for his role as Lt. Proctor in the Police Academy film series.  He also played the male lead in Club Fed and wrote for the Disney animated series, The Weekenders.

Life and career 
Kinsey was born in Calgary, Alberta, Canada, and grew up in Chagrin Falls, Ohio. He attended Hawken School in Gates Mills, Ohio and graduated from Vanderbilt University in Nashville, Tennessee. He majored in drama and after college apprenticed at Actors Theatre of Louisville. Then he performed with other regional theaters, dinner theaters, and national touring companies.

Kinsey moved to Chicago and joined the Second City comedy troupe where he wrote and starred in several consecutive revues. He taught improv at high schools and colleges including Columbia College in Illinois as well as the Goodman Theatre. He was nominated for two Joseph Jefferson Awards.

Kinsey has appeared in television, film, and theatre productions, but is probably best known to audiences as Proctor, the supercilious sidekick of Commandant Mauser and Captain Harris in the Police Academy film series. Kinsey also writes and produces for television and film. He appeared in one episode of The Amanda Show in 1999.

Personal life

Kinsey is married, his wife is Nancy, they met in Chicago at Second City. They have a son, Matt, and daughter, Logan. They live in Los Angeles, California.

Filmography

References

External links
 

1959 births
Living people
Canadian male film actors
Canadian male screenwriters
Canadian male television actors
Male actors from Calgary
Writers from Calgary
People from Chagrin Falls, Ohio